The 1994 season was Santos FC's eighty-second season in existence and club's thirty-fifth in the top flight of Brazilian football since Brasileirão era.

Players

Squad

Source: Acervo Santista

Statistics

Appearances and goals

Source: Match reports in Competitive matches

Goalscorers

Source: Match reports in Competitive matches

Transfers

In

Out

Friendlies

Competitions

Campeonato Brasileiro

Results summary

First stage

Matches

Second stage

First round

Matches

Second round

Matches

Campeonato Paulista

Results summary

League table

Matches

Copa Bandeirantes

First stage

Matches

Final

Supercopa Libertadores

Round of 16

References

External links
Official Site

1994
Brazilian football clubs 1994 season